The 1999–2000 2. Bundesliga season was the twenty-sixth season of the 2. Bundesliga, the second tier of the German football league system.

1. FC Köln, VfL Bochum and FC Energie Cottbus were promoted to the Bundesliga while Tennis Borussia Berlin, Fortuna Köln, Kickers Offenbach and Karlsruher SC were relegated to the Regionalliga. Fortuna Köln had, up till then, played every one of the twenty-six seasons of the 2. Bundesliga since 1974 in the league.

League table
For the 1999–2000 season SV Waldhof Mannheim, Kickers Offenbach, Chemnitzer FC and Alemannia Aachen were newly promoted to the 2. Bundesliga from the Regionalliga while 1. FC Nürnberg, VfL Bochum and Borussia Mönchengladbach had been relegated to the league from the Bundesliga.

Results

Top scorers 
The league's top scorers:

References

External links
 2. Bundesliga 1999/2000 at Weltfussball.de 
 1999–2000 2. Bundesliga  kicker.de

2. Bundesliga seasons
2
Germany